The Can de Chira (also known as the perro pastor altoaragonés) is a breed of herding dog from the High Aragon region of Spain.

Accounts of similar dogs used by Spanish graziers to herd sheep and cattle (in Aragonese "Can de Chira" literally it means "dog for turn" or "return the cattle") date back several centuries, the oldest photographs date from the early 19th century. The breed appears to have originated in the Province of Huesca but has spread to adjacent regions, but the breed remains centered in Sobrarbe.

See also
 Dogs portal
 List of dog breeds

References

External links 
 The perro pastor aragonés
 Blog about Can de Chira
 The Adventures of Fato and Mora
 Report broadcast on TV about Can de Chira

Dog breeds originating in Aragon
Herding dogs